John Howard (born 22 October 1952) is an Australian stage and screen actor. Howard is best known for his appearances in the television series Blue Heelers, SeaChange, Always Greener, All Saints and Packed to the Rafters.

Career

Film
Howard was born in Corowa, New South Wales. He graduated from National Institute of Dramatic Art (NIDA). His first role was The Club. He appeared in the 1988 film Young Einstein, the 2001 film The Man Who Sued God, the 2006 film Jindabyne and had a minor supporting role in the 2012 Australian comedy Any Questions for Ben?, along with the 2015 film Mad Max: Fury Road. He also appeared in the 2015 released Australian road film Last Cab to Darwin.

Television
Howard is also a television actor and has appeared in a number of Australian programs. He began his career as Bob Scott in Young Ramsay (1979-1980) starred in the children's program The Girl from Tomorrow as the evil Silverthorn, and he has played Frank Reilly in Wildside (1997–1998), Bob Jelly in SeaChange (1998–2000) and John Taylor in Always Greener (2001–2003).  He also played Dr. Frank Campion in the Australian medical TV drama All Saints (2004-2009). He had a role in Packed to the Rafters for a season (2010-2011) and the first series of the ABC Drama Janet King.

Theatre
Howard served as the associate director of Sydney Theatre Company between 1992 and 1996. He also acted numerous roles in plays including Shrine, Rising Water, Mongrels, The Crucible, The Life of Galileo, Dead White Males, and Measure for Measure.

Awards
He was the recipient of Sydney Critics Circle Best Stage Actor Award in 1991 and the Variety Club of Australia Stage Actor Heart Award in 1992. Howard has also won the Most Outstanding Actor award at the 2001 Logie Awards for his role in SeaChange, the 2009 Sydney Critics Circle Awards for Best Stage Actor, and the Centenary Medal for Service to the Arts and the Community.

ARIA Music Awards
The ARIA Music Awards is an annual awards ceremony that recognises excellence, innovation, and achievement across all genres of Australian music. They commenced in 1987. 

! 
|-
| 1989
| Australia Day / Child of Australia (with Sydney Symphony Orchestra, Australian Youth Orchestra, & Joan Carden
|Best Classical Album
| 
| 
|-

References

External links

1952 births
20th-century Australian male actors
21st-century Australian male actors
Australian male film actors
Australian male stage actors
Australian male television actors
Living people
Logie Award winners
Male actors from Sydney
National Institute of Dramatic Art alumni